Morón is a partido (second level administrative division) of the Buenos Aires Province, Argentina.

Districts
 Morón
 Castelar
 Haedo
 El Palomar
 Villa Sarmiento

References

External links

 
InfoBAN Morón (Spanish)

 
Partidos of Buenos Aires Province
1874 establishments in Argentina